This is a list of countries by stem cell research trials for the purpose of commercializing treatments as of March 2014, using data from ClinicalTrials.gov.

References 

Research trials by country
Research trials by country
 
Cell biology
Cloning
Lists of countries